William Cowell (born 7 December 1902) was a professional footballer, who played for Huddersfield Town, Hartlepool United and Derby County.

References

1902 births
Year of death missing
Sportspeople from Hexham
Footballers from Northumberland
English footballers
Association football goalkeepers
English Football League players
Huddersfield Town A.F.C. players
Hartlepool United F.C. players
Grimsby Town F.C. players